Mariposa station is an elevated light rail station on the C Line of the Los Angeles Metro Rail system. It is located over Mariposa Avenue, after which the station is named, and alongside Nash Street in El Segundo, California.

Mariposa is close to several sports venues: the Toyota Sports Center, the practice facility for the Los Angeles Kings and Ontario Reign hockey teams, the UCLA Health Training Center, the practice facility for the Los Angeles Lakers and the venue for the South Bay Lakers, and the Campus El Segundo Athletic Fields, two recreational grass fields.

The original name for the station was Mariposa Ave/Nash St, but was later simplified to just Mariposa.

The train platform, currently suitable for two-car trains, may be lengthened to accommodate three-car trains to enable increased capacity of the line.

Service

Station layout

Hours and frequency

Connections 
, the following connections are available:
 Los Angeles Metro Bus: 
 Torrance Transit: 8

Notable places nearby 
The station is within walking distance of the following notable places:
 Campus El Segundo Athletic Fields
 Toyota Sports Center
 UCLA Health Training Center

References 

C Line (Los Angeles Metro) stations
El Segundo, California
Railway stations in the United States opened in 1995
1995 establishments in California